Brian Lee Keyser (born October 31, 1966) is a retired Major League Baseball pitcher. He played during two seasons at the major league level for the Chicago White Sox. He was drafted by the White Sox in the 19th round of the  amateur draft. On May 15, 1996, Keyser picked up his only major league save during a 20-8 blowout White Sox win over the Brewers. Keyser pitched the final four innings and saved the game for starter Wilson Alvarez.

References

Career statistics and player information from Baseball-Reference, or Baseball-Reference (Minors), or The Baseball Cube

External links
Retrosheet
Pura Pelota Venezuelan Professional Baseball League statistics

1966 births
Baseball players from California
Birmingham Barons players
Caribes de Oriente players
American expatriate baseball players in Venezuela
Chicago White Sox players
Indianapolis Indians players
Living people
Nashville Sounds players
Major League Baseball pitchers
Sarasota White Sox players
Sportspeople from Castro Valley, California
Utica Blue Sox players
People from Castro Valley, California
Stanford Cardinal baseball players